Esk River, a perennial stream that is part of the Clarence River catchment, is located in the Northern Rivers region of New South Wales, Australia.

Course and features
Esk River rises below Richmond Range, southeast of Tabbimoble, and flows generally to south through Bundjalung National Park towards its confluence with the northern arm of the Clarence River, northwest of the coastal fishing village of Iluka. The river descends  over its  course.

The river is an increasingly popular kayak fishing location that is home to a variety of fish species such as yellowfin bream, dusky flathead and sand whiting in its lower brackish areas and has a good population of Australian bass in its fresh water reaches. The Esk River is considered the largest untouched coastal river system on the New South Wales North Coast.

See also

 List of rivers of Australia
 List of rivers of New South Wales (A–K)
 Rivers of New South Wales

References

 

Rivers of New South Wales
Northern Rivers